Levi Warner (October 10, 1831 – April 12, 1911) was a Democratic member of the United States House of Representatives from Connecticut's 4th congressional district from 1876 to 1879.

Early life and family 
His brother was Samuel Larkin Warner who was also a United States Representative from Connecticut. He was born in Wethersfield, Connecticut where he completed preparatory studies. Later, he attended the law department of Yale College and Dane Law School, Cambridge, Massachusetts. He was admitted to the bar in 1859 and commenced practice in Fairfield County, Connecticut before moving to Norwalk, Connecticut in 1858 and continuing the practice of law.

Political career 
Warner was elected to the Forty-fourth Congress to fill the vacancy caused by the resignation of William H. Barnum. He was reelected to the Forty-fifth Congress and served from December 4, 1876, to March 3, 1879. He was not a candidate for renomination in 1878. After leaving Congress, he resumed the practice of law. He died in Norwalk, Connecticut in 1911 and was buried in Riverside Cemetery.

Further reading 
 The Issue In Connecticut

References

1831 births
1911 deaths
Burials in Riverside Cemetery (Norwalk, Connecticut)
Connecticut lawyers
Harvard Law School alumni
Politicians from Norwalk, Connecticut
People from Wethersfield, Connecticut
Yale College alumni
Democratic Party members of the United States House of Representatives from Connecticut
19th-century American politicians
19th-century American lawyers